The Black Bible is a various artists compilation album released on October 13, 1998 by Cleopatra Records.

Reception

Keith Farley of AllMusic credits The Black Bible for starting well but criticizes it for stagnating once the second disc starts and presenting "more than 30 tracks of middling-to-downright-obnoxious industrial music."

Track listing

Personnel
Adapted from The Black Bible liner notes.

 Athan Maroulis – compiling
 Brian Perera – compiling

Release history

References

External links 
 The Black Bible at Discogs (list of releases)

1998 compilation albums
Cleopatra Records compilation albums